State Route 111 (SR 111) is a state highway in the U.S. state of California. It is the main north-south route and retail corridor through the Coachella Valley, a part of the Colorado Desert in the southeastern corner of the state and a famous resort destination. It also runs through the Imperial Valley, and along the eastern shore of the Salton Sea. Its southern terminus is in Calexico near the Calexico West Port of Entry on the U.S.-Mexico border, and its northern terminus is at Interstate 10 at the northwestern corner of the Palm Springs city limits, near the unincorporated community of Whitewater.

Route description

The highway begins near the Calexico West Port of Entry, where Calexico connects with the Mexican city Mexicali. Prior to the port of entry's 2018 realignment, SR 111 directly connected to the border crossing, with northbound traffic entering from Mexican side of the border via Avenida Cristóbal Colón, and southbound traffic exiting onto Mexican Federal Highway 5. Since then, traffic heading to the border diverts from SR 111 onto westbound East Second Street to the port of entry's new facilities at Cesar Chavez Boulevard. The segment of the highway from East Second Street south to the site of the former border crossing at East First Street remains under state control, pending any relinquishment by Caltrans.

SR 111 then intersects with SR 98 in Calexico before heading north to SR 86 in Heber. As SR 111 continues further north through Imperial County, it enters El Centro. There, it intersects with Interstate 8 (I-8), which runs east to Yuma and west to San Diego, before passing through the agricultural communities of Holtville, Brawley, Calipatria and Niland.

A nearly  length of the highway dotted with date and citrus groves follows both the old Southern Pacific "Sunset Route" (now the main Union Pacific line between Los Angeles and Yuma, Arizona) and the eastern shore of the Salton Sea. Though some small settlements and a California state park line the shore, the area is eerily empty due to the sea's rapidly declining water quality. The small town of North Shore is all but abandoned as a tourist destination, though more than 3,400 residents were counted at the 2010 census.

SR 111 enters the southeast corner of the Coachella Valley as a two-lane highway. It used to run concurrently with SR 86 in Coachella, but SR 86 has since been moved to a newer expressway alignment. SR 111 continues northwest as a major arterial road, four lanes or wider, through Indio, La Quinta, Indian Wells, Palm Desert, Rancho Mirage, and Cathedral City. As it approaches this area, the northbound traffic is on Indian Canyon Drive, and the southbound is on Palm Canyon Drive. An alternate route runs on Gene Autry Trail while mainline SR 111 continues west on Vista Chino. Continuing west from Cathedral City, the highway enters Palm Springs, then swings north and then west to bypass downtown, while SR 111 Business passes through the congested downtown area. The highway widens from an arterial road to a divided expressway as it exits Palm Springs just northwest of San Rafael Drive. It ends at an interchange with I-10 near the foot of San Jacinto Peak, just east of the San Gorgonio Pass.

SR 111 is part of the California Freeway and Expressway System and the portions south of SR 78, and in the city of Indio are part of the National Highway System, a network of highways that are considered essential to the country's economy, defense, and mobility by the Federal Highway Administration. SR 111 is eligible to be included in the State Scenic Highway System, but it is not officially designated as a scenic highway by the California Department of Transportation.

History

SR 111 was first proposed in the early  1930s due to the area's growth bought on by the Southern Pacific Railroad.

A 1993 rerouting of the highway takes drivers away from the historic center of Palm Springs, but meets with its original alignment as Business Route 111 a few miles further south.

The northern terminus was so busy in the 1950s before the construction of the freeway that visitors returning home to Los Angeles might have waited as long as two hours to make the left turn on the two-lane road that was once multiplexed as US Highways 60, 70 and 99. 

In 1995, Caltrans was allowed to relinquish any portion of Route 111 through a city for that city to maintain. The legislature opted to make the act an "urgency statute", effective immediately, so that the local governments could improve traffic bottlenecks along the route as soon as possible. The legislative definition of the route was amended in 1996 to exclude the portions in Rancho Mirage and Cathedral City, which had both been relinquished. Cathedral City completed a pedestrian-friendly redesign in 1998. The stretch through Rancho Mirage has the Coachella Valley's only synchronized traffic lights; they are set to 45 mph (70 km/h).

A 2003 law did not change the route, but clarified that the former highway through those cities could not be taken back by the state, and repealed the section added in 1995 allowing relinquishment to any city. Subsequently, in 2005, the legislature allowed relinquishment within Indian Wells, Indio, and Palm Desert, subject to the same conditions, and to the condition that the cities must maintain signs for the route. La Quinta was added to the list of eligible cities in 2007. As of late 2007, none of these four cities have taken over maintenance of Route 111.

In November 2005, signs on Verbenia Avenue at the highway's northern terminus and along Interstate 10 were replaced to reflect the street's name change to "Haugen-Lehmann Way", honoring two Riverside County sheriff's deputies gunned down by a sniper on that street in 1997.

In a similar move in December 2005, the stretch of SR 111 through La Quinta was named the "Deputy Bruce Lee Memorial Highway". Lee was a Riverside County deputy sheriff in the city for many years and was killed in 2003 during an altercation with a mentally disturbed suspect. The suspect was able to take Lee's baton during the altercation and used it to bludgeon the officer.

In September 2019 Caltrans began a three-phase $19-21.5 million mitigation project to protect SR-111 from a moving mud pot called the Niland Geyser, southeast of the Salton Sea near the junction with Davis and Gillespie Roads. The plans included using steel walls to divert water into a gravel wash, digging drainage under the road to direct subsurface water to a wash west of the road, and building a five-mile temporary road 50 feet to the west to divert around the geyser, with the original road being rebuilt once the geyser had passed. Work continued into 2021.

After being Imperial Avenue in Calexico, the road is known as the Imperial Pioneers Expressway and the Victor Veysey Expressway in Imperial County. Several parts of the route are at or under sea level, similar to SR 86 outside of Brawley.

Major intersections

Related route

State Route 111 Business (SR 111 Bus.) is a business route of SR 111 in Palm Springs. It follows the original routing of SR 111 through Palm Springs. The route is almost unsigned. There is only two business route signs on the southern and northern termini.

Like many other business routes, it follows the original routing of the parent route. In 1993, SR 111 was rerouted out of Palm Springs and onto the current alignment.

See also

References

External links

California @ AARoads.com - State Route 111
Caltrans: Route 111 highway conditions
California Highways: SR 111
Deputy Bruce Lee memorial page
Haugen/Lehmann memorial page

111
State Route 111
State Route 111
Colorado Desert
Coachella Valley
Imperial Valley
Calexico, California
Cathedral City, California
El Centro metropolitan area
Indio, California
Mexicali
Palm Springs, California
U.S. Route 99